Greg Clark,  an urbanist, is an author, global advisor, chairman and non-executive director. Clark has advised more than 300 cities, 50 national governments and a wide array of bodies including the OECD, Brookings Institution, the World Bank and the Urban Land Institute (ULI) on strategies for city development and investment. He also advises global investors and corporate service companies on how to align with city leaders.

Early life and education
Clark was born in Wimbledon, London in 1962 and was educated at the Jesuit Wimbledon College. Between 1980 and 1981, he spent time volunteering in Mexico City and New York, which was to ignite his interest in the world's biggest cities. He went on to Cambridge University, where he was JCR President. He joined the Local Economy Policy Unit (LEPU) (at London South Bank University) from 1988 to 1991 as a research fellow in London economic development. Between 1994 and 1996, Clark was selected as a Harkness Fellow based at Columbia University in New York City, where he read Globalisation and City and Regional Planning. From 1996 to 1998, he worked as a research scholar in city economic development at the London School of Economics.

Roles
Clark is an executive, a non-executive, a writer and advisor. His roles include: 
 Chair, Connected Places Catapult.
 Chair, UK Cities Climate Investment Commission.
 Board member, Transport for London, Chair, Transport for London Land and Property Committee, and member of TfL Finance and Crossrail Committees.
 Board Member, London Economic Action Partnership (LEAP).
 Chair, UK Government Secure Connected Places External Advisory Group.

He also holds some advisory roles including:
 Visiting professor, Cities and Innovation, Strathclyde University (Glasgow).
 WEF Global Future Council: Cities & Urbanisation.
 Bloomberg New Economy Forum, Cities Council. 
 Urban expert BBC World Service ‘My Perfect City’ series.

Career

From 1986 to 1990 Clark's career began to focus on city economies and employment, including roles at the British Refugee Council, The London Borough of Lambeth, and the Local Economy Policy Unit (South Bank University). In 1995, Clark was selected as a Harkness Fellow and was based at Columbia University in New York City, where he investigated City & Regional Planning and Metropolitan Governance. He spent much of 18 months of his Fellowship as a guest of the US Federal Government, assessing city and regional economic development in 12 US and Canadian Cities.

Clark returned to London in 1997, and took up a two-year part-time role as a research scholar in City and Regional Economics at the London School of Economics. Between 1990 and 2006 Clark held leadership roles in London in the sphere of urban economic development including: International Director at the London Docklands Development Corporation (1990–94), managing director, Economic Development at Greater London Enterprise, & Chief executive of the London Enterprise Agency 'One London' (1994–2001); executive director of Strategy and Communications, London Development Agency (2001–04). In 2004 Clark was appointed Lead Advisor on City/Regional Economic Development, Office of the Deputy Prime Minister (2004–10).

From 2004 to 2018 Clark had a range of advisory roles with global organisations and institutions, and has undertaken reviews of more than 300 cities around the world, chiefly for the OECD, Brookings Institution, World Bank and Urban Land Institute.  He has directed comparative studies and assessments of London and New York City, British and Spanish Cities, UK and Canadian Cities, and UK and Chinese Cities.

From 2018 to 2022 Clark was Group Advisor Future Cities and New Industries at HSBC.

Clark was previously a Commissioner on the UK City Growth Commission (2012 to 2014), Chairman of British BIDs (2010–14), a Commissioner on the West End Commission (2012–13), a member of the Lead Expert Group of the UK Future of Cities Foresight Project (2013–16), and a Chairman of the London Stansted Cambridge Consortium (2012–16). He was a member of the Crossrail 2 Growth Commission (2015–16) and the West Anglia Task Force . He was a member of the Promote London Council (2009/2011). He was chair of the OECD Forum of Cities and Regions from 1996 to 2016. He was Global Fellow at Brookings from 2010 to 2020.

The Future of Cities and Long Term Strategic Planning For Cities And Metropolitan Areas 

Clark has supported public and private partnerships leading metropolitan strategies and plans that integrate transport, land use, and economic development. His recent contributions include:

 Co-chairman of the Global Advisory Board for the 4th New York Region Strategic Plan, 2014–18.
 Chairman, Oslo International Advisory Board, since 2014.
 Chairman, Barcelona International Advisory Board, since 2017.
 Advice on future planning to Greater Sydney Commission and NSW Dept of Planning and Environment 2015–18.
 Chairman of the International Advisory Committee of the Salvador Strategic Plan, 2015–2016.
 Chairman of the International Advisory Board of the Vienna Tourism Strategy, 2014 – 2015, 2018-2019 
 Member of the International Advisory Board of the Turin Strategic Plan, 2014 to 2015. 
 Chairman of the International Advisory Committee for the Moscow Urban Strategic Plan. 2014 
 Chairman of the International Advisory Committee for the São Paulo 2040 Strategic Plan. 2010-2012 
 Advisor on the future development of Kowloon East, Hong Kong. 2012 
 Advisor on the development of the Gauteng 2055 Strategic Plan Johannesburg Region 2012.
 Advisor on Metropolitan Planning and Governance, State of Rio de Janeiro/World Bank.2012
 International Advisor on the Barcelona Metropolitan Strategic Plan. 2009-2011 
 International Advisor on the Auckland Strategic Plan. 2010-2012 
 International Advisor on the economic development strategy of Toronto. 2007-2008 
 International Advisor on the internationalisation strategy of Madrid.2008-2009 
 Advisor on strategic planning for Mumbai, Seoul, Istanbul.

Recognition
 In October 2016, Clark was awarded a Fellowship of the Academy of Social Sciences
 In 2016, Clark was awarded the Freedom of the City of London
 In 2015, Clark was awarded CBE (Commander of the Order of the British Empire) by HM Queen Elizabeth II for services to city and regional economic development.
 In 2015, Clark was appointed Honorary Ambassador to the City of Brisbane.
 In 2014, Clark was appointed Honorary Professor at UCL, and invited to co-chair the advisory board of the City Leadership Initiative.
 In 2013, Clark was appointed visiting professor at Strathclyde University (Glasgow).
 In 2012, Clark appointed Global Fellow at the Brookings Institution.
In 2011, Clark was awarded the commission to write the Honor Chapman Report, created to remember Honor Chapman who died in 2009. Clark's report on London's development as a world city since 1991 was published in 2012 and his subsequent book on London's past 25 years was published by Wiley Blackwell in December 2014.
In 2010, The City of Barcelona awarded him the John Shield's Prize, an award given once a year to the international person outside Barcelona that has done most to promote the city.
 In 2006, Clark was appointed visiting professor at Cass Business School, City University, City of London.
In 1995, Greg Clark was awarded a Harkness Fellowship by the Commonwealth Fund of New York, and was based at Columbia University in New York City as a visiting scholar.

Publications

Books
World Cities and Nations States, November 2016, Wiley
Global Cities:A Short History, September 2016, Brookings Institution Press
The Making of a World City: London 1991 to 2021 December 2014, Wiley
Local Economic Leadership June 2015, OECD LEED (with Moir, E, Moonen, T and Mountford, D)
 Delivering Local Development: New Growth and Investment Strategies Local Economic and Employment Development (LEED), 2013, OECD Publishing. (with Moonen, T)
 Investment Strategies and Financial Tools for Local Development, 2007, Local Economic and Employment Development (LEED), OECD Publishing. (with Mountford, D) (eds.)
 Organising Local Economic Development: The Role of Development Agencies and Companies, 2010 Local Economic and Employment Development (LEED), OECD Publishing. (with Huxley, J and Mountford, D)
 Recession, Recovery, and Reinvestment: the Role of Local Economic Leadership in a Global Crisis, 2008, Local Economic and Employment Development (LEED), OECD Publishing.
 Local Development Benefits from Staging Global Events, 2008, Local Economic and Employment Development (LEED), OECD Publishing.
 Investment Strategies and Financial Tools for Local Development, 2007, Local Economic and Employment Development (LEED), OECD Publishing. (with Moir,E and Gledhill,L)

Reports and Papers
 (with Moonen, T, Nunley, J and Simon, O) Benchmarking Sydney's Performance 2019, November 2019, Committee for Sydney. 
 (with Moonen, T and Nunley, J) The EIB in the city, October 2019, European Investment Bank.
 (with Moonen, T,  Nunley, J and Gille, B) Advantage Now: Holland Metropole into the 2020s, September 2019, Holland Metropole.
 (with Moonen, T,  Nunley, J and Morrissey, C) Demand and Disruption in Global Cities, September 2019, JLL and The Business of Cities.
 (with Moonen, T) La Ville Globale en Crise, Pistes de Réforme (Chapter in Les Villes Changent le Monde), August 2019, Institut Paris Region. 
 (with Gille, B) Towards the Zero-Carbon City, July 2019, HSBC Centre of Sustainable Finance. 
 (with Moonen, T, Simon, O and Gille, B) Mega Regions of the Future, June 2019, HSBC.
 (with Simon, O and Nunley, J) Grow with Warsaw, May 2019, Urban Land Institute.  
 (with Moonen, T, Simon, O and Nunley, J) Oslo: State of the City, February 2019, Oslo Business Region. 
 (with Moonen, T,  Nunley, J and Gille, B) Towards a Business Story for Glasgow, December 2018, The Business of Cities.  
 (with Moonen, T and Nunley, J) London: Mobility City, November 2018, European Investment Bank.
 (with Moonen, T and Nunley, J) Fulfilling Potential: Holland Metropole and the Decade of Change, October 2018, Holland Metropole.
 (with Moonen, T and Nunley, J) The Story of Your City: Europe and its Urban Development 1970 to 2020, October 2018, European Investment Bank.
 (with Moonen, T and Moir, E) Underpowered Cities (Chapter in Shaping Cities in an Urban Age), October 2018, LSE.
 (with Moonen, T and Nunley, J) Sustaining the Advantage:Benchmarking Sydney's Performance 2018, September 2018, Committee for Sydney.
 (with Moonen, T and Nunley, J) The Innovation Economy: Implications and Imperatives for States and Regions, August 2018, NSW Innovation and Productivity Council. 
 (with Moonen, T, Nunley, J and Morrissey C) Culture, Value and Place, August 2018, NSW Department of Planning and Environment.
 (with Moonen, T, Nunley, J and Morrissey C) Creating Great Australian Cities (Suite of 5 Papers), May 2018, Property Council of Australia. 
 (with Moonen T) Oslo: State of the City 2018, May 2018, Oslo Business Region. 
 (with Moonen, T and Nunley, J) Milan and Turin: Competitiveness of Italy's Great Northern Cities, April 2018, ULI. 
 (with Moonen, T, Feenan, R, Kelly, J and McBryde, W) World Cities: Mapping the Pathways to Success, February 2018, JLL.  
 (with Moonen, T and Nunley J) Benchmarking South East Queensland in a Global Context, October 2017, Queensland State Government. 
 (with Moonen, T and Nunley, J) Fit for the Future? Benchmarking Holland Metropole against the world's best, September 2017, City of Amsterdam and Partners. 
 (with Moonen, T and Couturier, J) London: the Negotiated City. London governance for a sustainable world city. (Essay in Steering the Metropolis: Metropolitan Governance for Sustainable Urban Development), October 2017, UN Habitat. 
 (with Moonen, T) Joining the Top Table? Benchmarking Sydney's Performance, July 2017, Committee for Sydney. 
 (with Moonen T, Feenan R, Kelly, J and McBryde, W) Decoding City Performance, September 2017, JLL.
 (with Moonen, T) The Logic of Innovation Locations, May 2017, Future Cities Catapult. 
 The Role of Real Estate Development in Urbanising Cities (Chapter in Finance for City Leaders Handbook), 2016, UN Habitat. 
 (with Moir, E and Moonen, T) Governance, Devolution and the Investment Ready City, December 2016, JLL. 
 The Case for the West End, August 2016, West End Partnership. 
 (with Moonen T), Metropolitan Areas: the complexity of the Metropolitan Age (Chapter in Co-creating the Urban Future: the Agenda of Metropolises, Cities and Territories), October 2016, UCLG. 
 The Seven Habits of Highly Effective Cities: Advice for Sydney, September 2016, Committee for Sydney. 
 Cities, Global Cities and Glasgow. Some Reflections, May 2016, University of Strathclyde. 
 (with Moir, E and Moonen, T) The Leadership of Cities, June 2016, UCL. 
 (with Moonen, T and Couturier J) Benchmarking the Future World of Cities, May 2016, JLL
 (with Moir, E, Moonen T, and Couturier J) Brussels and Antwerp: pathways to a competitive future, April 2016, ULI. 
 (with Moonen, T) Istanbul on the World Stage, February 2016, JLL Cities Research Centre. 
 (with Moir, E) Density: Drivers, Dividends and Debates June 2015, ULI
 (with Maxwell, J. A.) Tomorrow's City Centre: Glasgow Agenda, 2014, ULI
 (with Moir, E and Moonen, T) Underpowered Cities, November 2014, LSE Cities
 (with Moir, E) The Business of Cities September 2014, UK Government (Foresight Future of Cities Project)
 (with McDearman, B and Parilla, J) Ten Traits of Globally Fluent Metro Areas (US Version), June 2013, Brookings.
 (with Moonen, T) Ten Traits of Metropolitan Global Fluency (Int’l Version) Oct 2013, Brookings.
 (with Moonen, T) Urban Innovation and Investment: the Role of International Financial Institutions and Development Banks, 2014, Future Cities Catapult
 (with Rt Hon Greg Clark MP) Nations and the Wealth of Cities: A New Phase in Public Policy 2014, Centre for London.
 (with Moonen, T) Hong Kong: A Globally Fluent Metropolitan City (A case study for the Global Cities Initiative) June 2014, Brookings.
 (with Moir, E and Moonen, T) What are Future Cities? Origins, Meanings and Uses. June 2014, Government Office for Science
 (with Moir, E and Moonen, T) The Future of Cities: What is the Global Agenda? November 2014, UK Government Office for Science
 (with Moonen, T) Munich: A Globally Fluent Metropolitan Economy (A case study for the Global Cities Initiative) November 2014, Brookings.
 (with Moonen, T) Mumbai: India's Global City (A case study for the Global Cities Initiative) December 2014, Brookings.
 (with Moonen, T) World Cities and Nation States: Promoting A New Deal for the 21st Century January 2015, Moscow Urban Forum
  (with Moonen, T) Technology, Real Estate, and the Innovation Economy September 2015, ULI
 (with Moonen, T) The Density Dividend: Solutions for Growing and Shrinking Cities October 2015, ULI
 (with Moonen, T and Couturier, J) Globalisation and Competition: The New World of Cities November 2015, JLL
 (with Moonen, T) Europe's Cities in a Global Economy. 2013, Brookings JPMorganChase.
 (with Moonen, T) The Business of Cities 2013: What do 150 city indexes and benchmarking studies tell us about the urban world in 2013, 2013, Jones Lang La Salle
 (with Moonen, T) British Cities in a Global System: What can we offer International Learning 2010, The Work Foundation
 (with Evans, G & Nemecek, S) City Branding and Urban Investment, 2011, ULI
 (with Evans, G & Nemecek, S) The Urban Investment Opportunities of Global Events, 2010, ULI
 (with Huxley, J) Closing the Investment Gap in Europe's Cities, 2009, ULI
 Towards OpenCities, 2008, British Council
 The State of EU Urban Development, 2008, ULI
 The Urban Investment White Paper, 2009, ULI
 Internationalisation of OpenCities, 2010, British Council
 Leadership and Governance on OpenCities, 2010, British Council
 Managing Diversity in OpenCities, 2010, British Council
 Public Land and Urban Investment, 2010, ULI

References

External links

 Greg Clark website
 The Business of Cities website
 Greg Clark Amazon Author Page
 Official Biography produced for Glasgow City Economy Conference
 Radio Interview with Greg Clark: Cape Talk Radio Show July 2013 'Making Cities Work'
 Panel Discussion featuring Greg Clark at Global Cities Initiative, Denver Forum, June 2013
 Interview with Greg Clark: Auckland Rugby World Cup as a catalyst for growth
 Greg Clark Interview: Rethinking Cities
 OPENcities: Conversation with Greg Clark on openness in Cities of Migration
 Interview with Greg Clark on City Branding
 Greg Clark leads closing plenary of London Urban Age Conference. Also at: https://www.youtube.com/watch?v=VIhu0oBLXZg
 Greg Clark and city leaders speaking at the London Conference 2013 (Centre for London and JP Morgan Chase)
 Greg Clark speaks at Enabling Future Auckland Symposium, February 2014 (Committee for Auckland)
 Greg Clark speaks at 'One Step Ahead' Series on Competitiveness in Asia – Maintaining Innovation for Economic Growth, May 2014 (JP Morgan Asia Society)

Living people
1962 births
British Roman Catholics
People from Wimbledon, London
Urban theorists
Harkness Fellows
Commanders of the Order of the British Empire
People educated at Wimbledon College
Academics of Bayes Business School
Fellows of the Academy of Social Sciences